Eddy Offord (born 20 February 1943) is a retired English record producer and audio engineer who gained prominence in the 1970s for his work on albums by the progressive rock bands Emerson, Lake & Palmer and Yes.

Life and career
Offord studied physics at university, and landed a job as a trainee engineer at Advision Studios in London to fill in spare time. Not long into his time at the studio, he started work as an engineer. Offord would spend much of his career working at Advision Studios.

ELP wrote a tribute to Offord with the song "Are You Ready, Eddy?", featured on their 1971 album Tarkus.

In 1970, Offord began his partnership with Yes. The partnership was fruitful but tumultuous; Offord remarked that producing Yes was like "trying to produce five producers." He suggested that the band record Tales from Topographic Oceans (1973) in the countryside to try and ease tensions that had grown within the group, but the compromise was to record at Morgan Studios with trees, plants, and model cows. Following Relayer (1974), Yes and Offord parted ways, with Yes guitarist Steve Howe stating that Offord had become unreliable on tours.

In the late 1970s, Offord relocated to the United States where he worked in Woodstock, Atlanta, and Los Angeles. In 1994, after working on Grassroots by 311, Offord announced his retirement from the music business. In 2011, he changed his mind when his son introduced him to The Midnight Moan, and went on to produce their debut album.

Some albums produced and/or engineered by Eddy Offord
Albums with APOSTLES (produced mixed engineered).
 APOSTLES, (CD) Self titled (1992)
Albums with Brian Auger and the Trinity (as engineer)
 Open (1968; includes vocalist Julie Driscoll)
 Definitely What! (1969)
 Streetnoise (1969; includes Driscoll)
Albums with Emerson, Lake & Palmer (as engineer)
 Emerson, Lake & Palmer (1970)
 Tarkus (1971)
 Pictures at an Exhibition (1971)
 Trilogy (1972)
 Albums with Heads Hands and Feet
 Heads Hands and Feet (1971) (engineer)
 Tracks (1972) (engineer)
 Albums with Taste and Rory Gallagher
 Taste (1969) (engineer)
 On the Boards (1970) (engineer)
 Rory Gallagher (1971) (engineer)
Albums with Yes (as co-producer and engineer except where noted)
 Time and a Word (1970) (engineer only)
 The Yes Album (1971)
 Fragile (1971)
 Close to the Edge (1972)
 Yessongs (1973)
 Tales from Topographic Oceans (1973)
 Relayer (1974)
 Drama (1980) (co-producer only)
 Union (1991) (two tracks only)
Albums with Baker Gurvitz Army
 Baker Gurvitz Army (1974)
 Elysian Encounter (1975)
 Hearts on Fire (1976)
Album with David Sancious & Tone (as co-producer and engineer)
 True Stories (1978)
 Just As I Thought (1979)
Album with Rozetta Stone 1979 co-produced Philippe Saisse 
 Where's My Hero 1980
Guitars courtesy Polydor Records *Bruce Kulick (Blackjack)
Album with Blackjack
 Worlds Apart (1980)
Album with Andy Pratt 
 Motives  (1979)
Album with Dixie Dregs (co-producer with Steve Morse)
 Industry Standard (under the name The Dregs) (1982)
Albums with Pallas
 The Sentinel (1984)
Album with  Art in America
 Art in America (Sony/Pavillion 1983)
 Album with Jay Aaron (as co-engineer & co-producer with Jay Aaron)
 Jay Aaron Inside/Out (Warner Bros. 1990)
Albums with 311
 Music (1993)
 Grassroots (1994)
Albums with Opus (as producer)
 Opus (1987)
 Album with National Head Band
 Albert 1 (1971)
 Album with Tinsley Ellis
Storm Warning (1994)
 Hell or High Water (2002)
Albums with Utopia (engineer on 2 cuts)
 Ra (1977)

References

English record producers
English expatriates in the United States
Living people
Yes (band)
1947 births